Robert Ross (born February 8, 1981) is an American politician. He was a member of the Missouri House of Representatives, having served since 2013 to 2021. He is a member of the Republican party. In the 2020 election cycle, he was a candidate for the Missouri Senate, District 33. He narrowly lost the Republican primary for that seat to fellow State Representative Karla Eslinger.

Electoral history

State Representative

State Senate

References

Living people
Republican Party members of the Missouri House of Representatives
1981 births
21st-century American politicians
People from Houston, Missouri